Mamadou Diop may refer to:

Mamadou Diop (basketball, born 1955), Senegalese basketball player at the 1980 Summer Olympics
Mamadou Diop (basketball, born 1993), Senegalese basketball player
Mamadou Diop (politician) (1936–2018), Senegalese politician and former Mayor of Dakar
Mamadou Diop (musician) (born 1954), Senegalese musician
Mamadou Diop (triathlete), Senegalese triathlete